"Remorse for Intemperate Speech" is a poem written by Irish poet William Butler Yeats. It appeared in his 1933 volume of poems The Winding Stair and Other Poems. Yeats wrote this poem in August 1931. The contents speaks about the fanatic feelings and the capacity for hatred a person can feel in the dark part of the heart.

The poem, written in three stanzas with an AABAB rhyme scheme, is a lament on the anger and hatred that the Irish cannot ever really let go of; an inheritance of injustice and righteous resistance carried on for so long that it continues to tear at generation after generation.

Spectres of bloody battles past make it almost impossible for the Irish to set aside their uncontrollable anger and fanaticism buried deep in the culture. A fanaticism, at times, more damning than the original plundering English oppression, very nearly creating a permanent impediment to making peace with themselves or with their past.

1931 poems
Poetry by W. B. Yeats